The IIFA for Best Sound Re-Recording is a technical award chosen ahead of the ceremonies. The award is also known as IIFA for Best Sound Mixing.

The winners are listed below:-

See also 
 IIFA Awards
 Bollywood
 Cinema of India

External links
 2008 winners 

International Indian Film Academy Awards